Pole Creek is a stream in the U.S. state of South Dakota.

Pole Creek is lined with pole-shaped trees, hence the name.

See also
List of rivers of South Dakota

References

Rivers of Pennington County, South Dakota
Rivers of South Dakota